VUCA is an acronym coined in 1987, based on the leadership theories of Warren Bennis and Burt Nanus – to describe or to reflect on the volatility, uncertainty, complexity and ambiguity of general conditions and situations. The U.S. Army War College introduced the concept of VUCA to describe the more volatile, uncertain, complex and ambiguous multilateral world perceived as resulting from the end of the Cold War. More frequent use and discussion of the term "VUCA" began from 2002 and derives from this acronym from military education. It has subsequently taken root in emerging ideas in strategic leadership that apply in a wide range of organizations, from for-profit corporations to education.

Meaning
The deeper meaning of each element of VUCA serves to enhance the strategic significance of VUCA foresight and insight as well as the behaviour of groups and individuals in organizations. It discusses systemic failures and behavioural failures, which are characteristic of organisational failure.

 V = Volatility: the nature and dynamics of change, and the nature and speed of change forces and change catalysts. 
 U = Uncertainty: the lack of predictability, the prospects for surprise, and the sense of awareness and understanding of issues and events.
 C = Complexity: the multiplex of forces, the confounding of issues, no cause-and-effect chain and confusion that surrounds organization.
 A = Ambiguity: the haziness of reality, the potential for misreads, and the mixed meanings of conditions; cause-and-effect confusion.

These elements present the context in which organizations view their current and future state. They present boundaries for planning and policy management. They come together in ways that either confound decisions or sharpen the capacity to look ahead, plan ahead, and move ahead. VUCA sets the stage for managing and leading.

The particular meaning and relevance of VUCA often relates to how people view the conditions under which they make decisions, plan forward, manage risks, foster change and solve problems. In general, the premises of VUCA tend to shape an organization's capacity to:

Anticipate the Issues that Shape 
Understand the Consequences of Issues and Actions
Appreciate the Interdependence of Variables
Prepare for Alternative Realities and Challenges
Interpret and Address Relevant Opportunities

For most contemporary organizations – business, the military, education, government and others – VUCA is a practical code for awareness and readiness. Beyond the simple acronym is a body of knowledge that deals with learning models for VUCA preparedness, anticipation, evolution and intervention.

Themes

Failure in itself may not be a catastrophe, but failure to learn from failure definitely is. It is not enough to train leaders in core competencies without identifying the key factors that inhibit their using the resilience and adaptability that are vital in order to distinguish potential leaders from mediocre managers. Anticipating change as a result of VUCA is one outcome of resilient leadership. The capacity of individuals and organizations to deal with VUCA can be measured with a number of engagement themes:

Knowledge Management and Sense-Making
Planning and Readiness Considerations
Process Management and Resource Systems
Functional Responsiveness and Impact Models
Recovery Systems and Forward Practices
Systemic failures
Behavioural failures

At some level, the capacity for VUCA management and leadership hinges on enterprise value systems, assumptions and natural goals.  A "prepared and resolved" enterprise is engaged with a strategic agenda that is aware of and empowered by VUCA forces.

The capacity for VUCA leadership in strategic and operating terms depends on a well-developed mindset for gauging the technical, social, political, market and economic realities of the environment in which people work.  Working with deeper smarts about the elements of VUCA may be a driver for survival and sustainability in an otherwise complicated world.

Psychometrics which measure fluid intelligence by tracking information processing when faced with unfamiliar, dynamic and vague data can predict cognitive performance in VUCA environments.

Social Categorization

Volatility 
Volatility is the V component of VUCA. This refers to the different situational social-categorization of people due to specific traits or reactions that stand out during that particular situation. When people react/act based on a specific situation, there is a possibility that the public categorizes them into a different group than they were in a previous situation. These people might respond differently to individual situations due to social or environmental cues. The idea that situational occurrences cause certain social categorization is known as volatility and is one of the main aspects of the self-categorization theory.

Sociologists use volatility to understand better how stereotypes and social categorization is impacted based on the situation at hand as well as any outside forces that may lead people to perceive others differently. Volatility is the changing dynamic of social-categorization in a set of environmental situations. The dynamic can change due to any shift in a situation, whether it is social, technical, biological or anything of the like. Studies have been conducted, but it has proven difficult to find the specific component that causes the change in situational social-categorization.

There are two separate components that connect people to social identities. The first social cue is normative fit. This describes the degree that a person relates to the stereotypes and norms that others associate with their specific identity. For example, when a Hispanic woman is cleaning the house, most of the time, people connect gender stereotypes with this situation, while her ethnicity is not concerned, but when this same woman eats an enchilada, ethnicity stereotypes surface while her gender is not concerned. The second social cue is comparative fit. This is when a specific characteristic or trait of a person is prominent in certain situations when compared to other people. For example, as mentioned by Bodenhausen and Peery, when there is one woman in a room full of men. She sticks out because she is the only one of her gender compared to many others of the opposite gender. However, all of the men are clumped together because they do not have any specific traits that stands out among the rest of them. Comparative fit shows that people categorize others based on the comparative social context. In a certain situation, specific characteristics are made obvious due to the fact that others around that individual do not possess that characteristic. However, in other situations, this characteristic may be the norm and would not be a key characteristic in the categorization process.

People can also be less criticizing of the same person during different situations. For example, when looking at an African American man on the street of a low-income neighborhood and when looking at the same man inside a school of a high-income neighborhood, people will be less judgmental when seeing him in the school. Nothing else has changed about this man, other than his location. When individuals are spotted in certain social contexts, the basic-level categories are forgotten and the more partial categories are brought to light. This really helps to describe the problems of situational social-categorization and how stereotypes can shift the perspectives of those around an individual.

Uncertainty 
Uncertainty in the VUCA framework is almost just as it sounds: when the availability or predictability of information in events is unknown. Uncertainty often occurs in volatile environments that are complex in structure involving unanticipated interactions that are significant in uncertainty. Uncertainty may occur in the intention to imply causation or correlation between the events of a social perceiver and a target. Situations where there is either a lack of information to prove why a perception is in occurrence or informational availability but lack of causation are where uncertainty is salient.

The uncertainty component of the framework serves as a grey area and is compensated by the use of social categorization and/or stereotypes. Social categorization can be described as a collection of people that have no interaction but tend to share similar characteristics with one another. People have a tendency to engage in social categorization, especially when there is a lack of information surrounding the event. Literature suggests that there are default categories that tend to be assumed in the absence of any clear data when referring to someone's gender or race in the essence of a discussion.

Often individuals associate the use of general references (e.g. people, they, them, a group) with the male gender, meaning people = male. This instance often occurs when there is not enough information to clearly distinguish someone's gender. For example, when discussing a written piece of information most people will assume the author is a male. If an author's name is not available (lack of information) it is difficult to determine the gender of the author through the context of whatever was written. People will automatically label the author as a male without having any prior basis of gender, placing the author in a social category. This social categorization happens in this example, but people will also assume someone is a male if the gender is not known in many other situations as well.

Social categorization occurs in the realm of not only gender but also race. Default assumptions can be made, like in gender, to the race of an individual or a group of people based on prior known stereotypes. For example, race-occupation combinations such as a basketball player or a golf player will receive race assumptions. Without any information of the individual's race, a basketball player will be assumed to be black and a golf player will be assumed to be white. This is based upon stereotypes because of the majority of race in each sport tend to be dominated by a single race, but in reality, there are other races within each sport.

Complexity 
Complexity is the “C” component of VUCA, that refers to the interconnectivity and interdependence of multiple components in a system. When conducting research, complexity is a component that scholars have to keep in mind. The results of a deliberately controlled environment are unexpected because of the non-linear interaction and interdependencies within different groups and categories.

In a sociological aspect, the VUCA framework is utilized in research to understand social perception in the real world and how that plays into social categorization as well as stereotypes. Galen V Bodenhausen and Destiny Peery's article Social Categorization and Stereotyping In vivo: The VUCA Challenge, focused on researching how social categories impacted the process of social cognition and perception. The strategy used to conduct the research is to manipulate or isolate a single identity of a target while keeping all other identities constant. This method creates clear results of how a specific identity in a social category can change one's perception of other identities, thus creating stereotypes.

There are problems with categorizing an individual's social identity due to the complexity of an individual's background. This research fails to address the complexity of the real-world and the results from this highlighted an even great picture about social categorization and stereotyping. Complexity adds many layers of different components to an individual's identity and creates challenges for sociologists trying to examine social categories. In the real world, people are far more complex compared to a modified social environment. Individuals identify with more than one social category, which opens the door to a deeper discovery about stereotyping. Results from research conducted by Bodenhausen reveals that there are certain identities that are more dominant than others. Perceivers who recognize these specific identities latch on to it and associate their preconceived notion of such identity and make initial assumptions about the individuals and hence stereotypes are created.

On the other hand, perceivers who share some of the identities with the target become more open-minded. They also take into consideration more than one social identity at the same time and this is also known as cross-categorization effects. Some social categories are embedded in a larger categorical structure, which makes that subcategory even more crucial and outstanding to perceivers. Research on cross-categorization reveals that different types of categories can be activated in the mind of the social perceiver, which causes both positive and negative effects. A positive outcome is that perceivers are more open-minded despite other social stereotypes. They have more motivation to think deeply about the target and see past the most dominant social category. Bodenhausen also acknowledges that cross-categorization effects lead to social invisibility. Some types of cross-over identities may lessen the noticeability of other identities, which may cause targets to be subjected to “intersectional invisibility,”  where neither social identities have a distinct component and are overlooked.

Ambiguity 
Ambiguity is the “A” component of VUCA. This refers to when the general meaning of something is unclear even when an appropriate amount of information is provided. Many get confused about the meaning of ambiguity. It is similar to the idea of uncertainty but they have different factors. Uncertainty is when relevant information is unavailable and unknown, and ambiguity where relevant information is available but the overall meaning is still unknown. Both uncertainty and ambiguity exist in our culture today. Sociologists use ambiguity to determine how and why an answer has been developed. Sociologists focus on details such as if there was enough information present, and did the subject have the full amount of knowledge necessary to make a decision. and why did he/she come to their specific answer.

Ambiguity leads to people assuming an answer, and many times this leads assuming ones race, gender, and can even lead to class stereotypes. If a person has some information but still doesn't have the overall answer, the person starts to assume his/her own answer based on the relevant information he/she already possesses. For example, as mentioned by Bodenhausen we may occasionally encounter people who are sufficiently androgynous to make it difficult to ascertain their gender, and at least one study suggests that with brief exposure, androgynous individuals can sometimes be miscategorized on the basis of gender-atypical features (very long hair, for a man, or very short hair, for a woman. Overall, ambiguity leads to the categorization of many. For example, it may lead to assuming one's sexual orientation. Unless a person is open about their own sexual orientation, people will automatically assume that they are heterosexual. But if a man possesses feminine qualities or a female possesses masculine qualities then they might be portrayed as either gay or lesbian. Ambiguity leads to the categorization of people without further important details that could lead to untrue conclusions.

Sociologists believe that ambiguity can lead to race stereotypes and discrimination. In a study done in South Africa by three sociologists, they had white citizens of South Africa look at pictures of racially mixed faces and they had to decide whether these faces were European or African. Because these test subjects were all white they had a hard problem defining these mixed-race faces as European and deemed them all to be African. The reason they did this is because of ambiguity. The information that was available was the skin tone of the people in the pictures and the facial qualities they possessed, with this information the test subjects had all of that information available but still did not know the answer for sure. They overall assumed because they did not look exactly like them, then they could not be European.

Responses and Revisions
Levent Işıklıgöz has suggested that the "C" of VUCA be changed from Complexity to Chaos, arguing that it is more suitable according to our era. This is still discussed in sociology society.

Bill George, a professor of management practice at Harvard Business School, argues that VUCA calls for a leadership response which he calls VUCA 2.0: Vision, Understanding, Courage and Adaptability.

Ali Aslan Gümüsay adds paradox to the acronym calling it VUCA + paradox and VUCAP.

See also
Antifragile (disambiguation)
Cynefin framework
Fear, uncertainty, and doubt (FUD)
Global Simplicity Index
Goldilocks process
Innovation butterfly

References

Business models